Taylor Jae Ortlepp (born 22 June 1997) is an Australian professional basketball player. She also plays Australian rules football in the AFLW.

Early life
Ortlepp grew up playing basketball in country South Australia before moving to Adelaide as an U16, where she played the rest of her junior career with Norwood Basketball Club and attended Saint Ignatius' College.

Basketball career

Early years
Ortlepp played three seasons in the South Australian Premier League for the Norwood Flames between 2014 and 2016. She also spent the 2014–15 WNBL season with the Adelaide Lightning.

College
Between 2016 and 2020, Ortlepp played college basketball in the United States for the Boston College Eagles.

Professional
In 2020, Ortlepp played for the Adelaide Lightning in the WNBL Hub season. After a season with the North Adelaide Rockets in the NBL1 Central, she returned to the Lightning for the 2021–22 WNBL season. She then joined the Rockingham Flames for the 2022 NBL1 West season.

On 28 January 2023, Ortlepp signed with the Melbourne Boomers for the rest of the 2022–23 WNBL season.

National team
Ortlepp first represented Australia in 2013 at the FIBA Oceania Under-16 Championship in Melbourne. She would then go on to represent Australia at the 2014 FIBA Under-17 World Championship in the Czech Republic, where they finished in fifth place, with a 6–1 record.

Football career
Ortlepp debuted in the AFLW in 2022 with Carlton.

Personal life
Ortlepp is the daughter of Julie and Grant, and has a brother, Cameron.

References

External links
Carlton AFLW profile
Boston College Eagles bio

1997 births
Living people
Adelaide Lightning players
Australian women's basketball players
Boston College Eagles women's basketball players
Carlton Football Club (AFLW) players
Guards (basketball)
Melbourne Boomers players